Love Thy Neighbor is an American sitcom television series on the Oprah Winfrey Network that debuted on May 29, 2013 at 9/8c. Love Thy Neighbor is a half-hour sitcom revolving around diner owner Hattie Mae Love and her middle-class family's daily triumphs and struggles. The focal point of the show is a location known as the Love Train Diner, an old locomotive car converted to a diner that serves up all of Hattie Mae's old recipes. It is the neighborhood hang out spot that, along with great food, serves up a lot of fun and offers advice to its customers in all walks of life. The series is written, directed and produced by Tyler Perry.

Series overview

Episodes

Season 1 (2013)

Half of Season 1 (2014)

Season 2(2015)

Season 3 (2016)

Season 4 (2017)

References

Lists of American sitcom episodes